Pierzchała may refer to:

 Pierzchała coat of arms
 Pierzchała (surname)

See also